Cacongo (ex-Lândana, Concelho de Cacongo, Malemba, or Molembo) is a municipality in Cabinda Province, an exclave of Angola. Its principal town is Cacongo. Landana lies on the coast of the Atlantic Ocean, adjacent to Landana Bay.

History

At the time of the arrival of the Portuguese in the 15th Century it was populated by the Kongo people and was the major portion of the Kingdom of Kakongo.

Geology
The coast of Lândana is known by the Paleocene fossils, including Cabindachelys landanensis, Congosaurus, and Cimomia landanensis.

See also
 List of lighthouses in Angola

References

Populated places in Cabinda Province
Lighthouses in Angola